Joseph Duffy (born 18 February 1988) is an Irish retired mixed martial artist who competed in the lightweight division of the Ultimate Fighting Championship (UFC). A professional since 2008, he has formerly competed for Cage Warriors and was a contestant on The Ultimate Fighter: Team GSP vs. Team Koscheck. He is also a former professional boxer. He holds a notable victory over the former UFC lightweight and featherweight double-champion, Conor McGregor.

Early life
Duffy is from Meenbanad, Burtonport, County Donegal. His family emigrated when he was young to the industrial town of Ebbw Vale in Wales, from where they travelled back and forth to Burtonport regularly.

Duffy is an avid rugby fan, and growing up he says "I would always have made it known I wasn’t from Wales", which made his support for Ireland during the Six Nations a bit difficult sometimes. He claimed "if Ireland lost in the rugby, I would try to skip the next day at school, just to avoid the hassle it would bring". Duffy also played the sport through his youth, and despite captaining his school’s rugby team, it was martial arts that always occupied the majority of Duffy’s time. He started with taekwon-do before progressing to traditional jiu-jitsu, a foundation that eventually led him to a career in professional MMA.

Boxing career
Despite knowing from an early age that he wanted to be a MMA fighter, Duffy said "I always wondered how I would get on in boxing". He continued "it was never something I thought about pursuing. I had never boxed, even at amateur, until a few years ago". Duffy cited "the opportunity to work with one of the best coaches in the boxing world" as the main reason for his switch, and the chance "to spar with some of the best fighters in the world; James DeGale, Andy Lee, George Groves, Chris Eubank, Jr.", something he deemed "priceless". The decision was then made even easier, with Duffy explaining "I was fortunate enough to have sponsors to back me as well. That took care of the financial worries".

When reflecting on the experience, he stated "More than anything, I’m a person who doesn’t want to have any regrets. When I’m old I want to be able to say that I gave it a go. That’s what it was. I got to fight professionally and I got to spar with some of the best fighters in the world".

Mixed martial arts career
Duffy started his career as a welterweight, fighting in various regional promotions across the UK. Duffy defeated the former UFC two-weight champion, Conor McGregor, and Northern Irishman Norman Parke, who later went on to the join the UFC. It was after this fight that Duffy signed with Cage Warriors, the biggest MMA promotion in Europe.

The Ultimate Fighter
In February 2010, Duffy was announced as a cast member of The Ultimate Fighter 12 where he competed as a lightweight. In his first fight, Duffy lost to Kyle Watson via rear-naked choke in the first round, and was subsequently eliminated from the show.

Cage Warriors Fighting Championship
Duffy made his name and rose to prominence while fighting under the CWFC banner. In his first bout with the promotion, Duffy submitted Conor McGregor, another Irish fighter who went on to UFC stardom.

In 2011, Duffy earned a Cage Warriors title shot against Ivan Musardo. Duffy lost the fight, breaking his hand in the third round, and being subsequently submitted in the fourth.

Following his recovery, Duffy switched his attention to pro boxing. He amassed a 7–0 record before returning to Cage Warriors in 2014. Duffy's first fight back was against Frenchman, Damien Lapilus. Duffy won via rear-naked choke, 2 minutes and 18 seconds into the third round.

Three months later he defeated another Frenchman, Julien Boussuge. This time detecting his opponent's intention for a takedown, and connecting a clean knee to the head when Boussuge changed levels. It was an instant knockout.

Ultimate Fighting Championship
In January 2015, the UFC announced they had signed Duffy.

Duffy was expected to make his promotional debut against Vagner Rocha on 14 March 2015 at UFC 185. However, Rocha pulled out of the bout in early February citing injury and was replaced by Jake Lindsey. Duffy won the fight via TKO in the first round after wobbling his opponent with a head kick and then dropping Lindsey with a body shot, forcing the stoppage.

Duffy faced Ivan Jorge on 18 July 2015 at UFC Fight Night 72. He won the fight via submission in the first round.  He also earned a Performance of the Night bonus.

Duffy was expected to face Dustin Poirier on 24 October 2015 at UFC Fight Night 76. However, Duffy pulled out of the fight on 21 October citing a concussion he incurred during a sparring session. In turn, the pairing was rescheduled, and took place on 2 January 2016 at UFC 195. Duffy lost the fight by unanimous decision (30–26, 30–27, 30–27).

Duffy next faced Mitch Clarke on 7 July 2016 at UFC Fight Night 90. He won the fight via submission in the opening minute of the first round.

Duffy faced Reza Madadi on 18 March 2017 at UFC Fight Night 107. He won the fight by unanimous decision.

On 13 July 2017, Duffy's manager Graham Boylan revealed Duffy had signed a new seven-fight contract with UFC.

Duffy faced James Vick on 4 November 2017 at UFC 217. He lost the fight via TKO in the second round.

Duffy was expected to face Ross Pearson on 2 December 2018 at UFC Fight Night 142. However, Pearson announced on 7 November that he was out of the bout due to a broken nose and subsequent surgery to correct the injury. and he was replaced by newcomer M-1 Global Lightweight Champion Damir Ismagulov. In turn Duffy pulled out from the event, citing a rib injury.

Duffy faced Marc Diakiese on 16 March 2019 at UFC Fight Night 147. He lost the fight by unanimous decision.

Duffy faced Joel Álvarez on 19 July 2020 at UFC Fight Night 172. He lost the fight via a guillotine choke in round one. After the fight, Duffy announced his retirement from MMA competition.

Championships and accomplishments
Ultimate Fighting Championship
Performance of the Night (One time) vs. Ivan Jorge
MMA Junkie
Submission of the Month - July 2015 vs. Ivan Jorge

Mixed martial arts record

|Loss
|align=center|16–5
|Joel Álvarez
|Submission (guillotine choke)
|UFC Fight Night: Figueiredo vs. Benavidez 2 
|
|align=center|1
|align=center|2:25
|Abu Dhabi, United Arab Emirates
|
|-
|Loss
|align=center|16–4
|Marc Diakiese
|Decision (unanimous)
|UFC Fight Night: Till vs. Masvidal 
|
|align=center|3
|align=center|5:00
|London, England
|
|-  
|Loss
|align=center|16–3
|James Vick
|TKO (punches)
|UFC 217
|
|align=center|2
|align=center|4:59
|New York City, New York, United States
|
|-
|Win
|align=center|16–2
|Reza Madadi
|Decision (unanimous)
|UFC Fight Night: Manuwa vs. Anderson
|
|align=center|3
|align=center|5:00
|London, England
|
|-
|Win
|align=center|15–2
|Mitch Clarke
|Submission (rear-naked choke)
|UFC Fight Night: dos Anjos vs. Alvarez
|
|align=center|1
|align=center|0:25
|Las Vegas, Nevada, United States
|
|-
|Loss
| align=center|14–2
| Dustin Poirier 
| Decision (unanimous)
| UFC 195
| 
| align=center|3
| align=center|5:00
| Las Vegas, Nevada, United States
|
|-
| Win
| align=center| 14–1
| Ivan Jorge
| Submission (triangle choke)
| UFC Fight Night: Bisping vs. Leites
| 
| align=center| 1
| align=center| 3:05
| Glasgow, Scotland
| 
|-
| Win
| align=center| 13–1
| Jake Lindsey
| TKO (head kick and body punch)
| UFC 185
| 
| align=center| 1
| align=center| 1:47
| Dallas, Texas, United States
| 
|-
| Win
| align=center| 12–1
| Julien Boussuge
| KO (knee)
| CWFC 74
| 
| align=center| 1
| align=center| 0:36
| London, England
|
|-
| Win
| align=center| 11–1
| Damien Lapilus
| Submission (rear-naked choke)
| CWFC 70
| 
| align=center| 3
| align=center| 2:18
| Dublin, Ireland
| 
|-
|Loss
| align=center| 10–1
| Ivan Musardo
| Submission (guillotine choke) 
| Cage Warriors 44
| 
| align=center| 4
| align=center| 4:25
| Kentish Town, England
| 
|-
| Win
| align=center| 10–0
| Francis Heagney
| Decision (unanimous)
|Cage Warriors 43
| 
| align=center| 3
| align=center| 5:00
| Kentish Town, England
| 
|-
| Win
| align=center| 9–0
| Oriol Gaset
| TKO (punches) 
| Cage Warriors 42
| 
| align=center| 1
| align=center| 2:46
| Cork City, Ireland
| 
|-
| Win
| align=center| 8–0
| Tom Maguire
| Submission (triangle choke)
| Cage Warriors 40
| 
| align=center| 1
| align=center| 4:47
| Kentish Town, England
| 
|-
| Win
| align=center| 7–0
| Conor McGregor
| Submission (arm-triangle choke) 
| Cage Warriors 39
| 
| align=center| 1
| align=center| 0:38
| Cork City, Ireland
| 
|-
| Win
| align=center| 6–0
| Norman Parke
| Submission (rear-naked choke)
| Spartan Fight Challenge 3
| 
| align=center| 1
| align=center| 3:06
| Newport, Wales
| 
|-
| Win
| align=center| 5–0
| Sebastien Grandin
| Submission (triangle choke)
| KnuckleUp MMA 3
| 
| align=center| 1
| align=center| 1:36
| Newport, Wales
| 
|-
| Win
| align=center| 4–0
| Marius Buzinskas
| Submission (rear-naked choke)
| Spartan Fight Challenge 1
| 
| align=center| 1
| align=center| N/A
| Somerset, England
| 
|-
| Win
| align=center| 3–0
| James Bryan
| Submission (rear-naked choke)
| KnuckleUp MMA 1 
| 
| align=center| 1
| align=center| 1:55
| Somerset, England
|
|-
| Win
| align=center| 2–0
| Ciaran Fry
| Submission (triangle choke)
| Angrrr Management 18: Holly Brawl
| 
| align=center| 1
| align=center| 1:24
| Weston-super-Mare, England
| 
|-
| Win
| align=center| 1–0
|  Mick Broster
| TKO (doctor stoppage)
| Angrrr Management 15: The Octagon Club
| 
| align=center| 1
| align=center| 2:33
| Kidderminster, England
|

Mixed martial arts exhibition and amateur record

|-
| Loss
|align=center| 2–1
| Kyle Watson
| Submission (rear-naked choke)
| The Ultimate Fighter: Team GSP vs. Team Koscheck
|  (air date)
|align=center| 1
|align=center| 3:33
| Las Vegas, Nevada, United States
|
|-
| Win
|align=center| 2–0
| Adam Stanton
| Submission (triangle choke)
| Angrrr Management 9: Southern Agrrression 4
| 
|align=center| 1
|align=center| 1:34
| Weston Super Mare, England
|
|-
| Win
|align=center| 1–0
| Tim Newman
| Submission (triangle choke)
| Grapple & Strike 9
| 
|align=center| 1
|align=center| 2:05
| Ebbw Vale, Wales
|

Professional boxing record

{|class="wikitable" style="text-align:center; font-size:95%"
|-
!
!Result
!Record
!Opponent
!Method
!Round, time
!Date
!Location
!Notes
|- align=center
|7
|Win
|7–0
|align=left| Attila Tibor Nagy
|
|
|
|align=left| Camden Centre, Kings Cross, London, England
|
|- align=center
|6
|Win
|6–0
|align=left| Ionut Trandafir Ilie	
|
|
|
|align=left| Bärengarten, Ravensburg, Baden-Württemberg, Germany
|
|- align=center
|5
|Win
|5–0
|align=left| Jay Morris
|
|
|
|align=left| York Hall, Bethnal Green, London, England
|
|- align=center
|4
|Win
|4–0
|align=left| James Conroy
|
|
|
|align=left| Camden Centre, Kings Cross, London, England	
|
|- align=center
|3
|Win
|3–0
|align=left| Gilson De Jesus
|
|
|
|align=left| Camden Centre, Kings Cross, London, England
|
|- align=center
|2
|Win
|2–0
|align=left| Paul Morby
|
|
|
|align=left| Coronet Theatre, Elephant & Castle, London, England
|
|- align=center
|1
|Win
|1–0
|align=left| Angelo Crowe
|
|
|
|align=left| Oceana, Swansea, Wales
|

See also
 List of Irish UFC fighters
 List of current UFC fighters
 List of male mixed martial artists
 List of mixed martial artists with professional boxing records

References

External links
  
 

1988 births
Sportspeople from County Donegal
Living people
Irish male mixed martial artists
Irish male boxers
Irish Jujutsuka
Welterweight mixed martial artists
Lightweight mixed martial artists
Mixed martial artists utilizing boxing
Mixed martial artists utilizing taekwondo
Mixed martial artists utilizing jujutsu
Mixed martial artists utilizing Brazilian jiu-jitsu
Irish practitioners of Brazilian jiu-jitsu
Irish male taekwondo practitioners
Ultimate Fighting Championship male fighters